The Labor Reform Act of 1977 was a proposed Act of the US Congress on US labor law that never came into force. It would have altered the labor legislation to bring it in line with modern developments and international standards by removing obstacles from employers to the formation of unions in the workplace.

The Act would have made the following changes:
Amend the National Labor Relations Act to increase the size of the National Labor Relations Board to seven members and the terms of Board members to seven years.
Direct the Board to issue rules to protect specified rights of employee and labor organizations, facilitate the resolution voter eligibility disputes, and govern elections in cases in which an appeal had not been decided before the date of election.
Create faster elections if a majority of members of a bargaining unit sought recognition of a union or decertification of an existing union.
Specify damages if there was an unlawful refusal to bargain prior to entry into a first bargaining contract.
Provide for expedited consideration and relief from certain alleged unfair labor practices which resulted in a deprivation of employment.
Deny for up to three years public contracts to persons willfully violating final orders regarding unfair labor practices.

See also
Employee Free Choice Act
US labor law
UK labour law

References

United States labor law